Pseudophilautus hoffmanni, known as Hoffman's shrub frog, is a species of frog in the family Rhacophoridae. It is endemic to Sri Lanka and only known from near its type locality in the Knuckles Mountain Range.

Its natural habitat is closed-canopy montane cloud forest where it has been found in shrubs in gaps. It also occurs in cardamon plantations within the forest and in gaps caused by selective logging. It is threatened by habitat loss caused by subsistence agriculture and logging. Also drought is a threat.

References

hoffmanni
Endemic fauna of Sri Lanka
Frogs of Sri Lanka
Amphibians described in 2005
Taxonomy articles created by Polbot